Tóc Tiên is a commune (xã) and village in the district-level town of Phú Mỹ, Bà Rịa–Vũng Tàu province, in Vietnam. In 2009, Charm Urban Development Ltd Co announced that it would build a $600 million Toc Tien Urban Area.

References

Populated places in Bà Rịa-Vũng Tàu province
Communes of Bà Rịa-Vũng Tàu province